Didier Mejía Esquivel (born 20 July 1941) is a Mexican sprinter. He competed in the men's 400 metres at the 1964 Summer Olympics.

References

1941 births
Living people
Athletes (track and field) at the 1963 Pan American Games
Athletes (track and field) at the 1964 Summer Olympics
Mexican male sprinters
Olympic athletes of Mexico
Place of birth missing (living people)
Pan American Games competitors for Mexico
20th-century Mexican people